Cyclophora cedrici is a moth in the  family Geometridae. It is found on Príncipe.

References

Moths described in 1991
Cyclophora (moth)
Moths of Africa